Shannon Christensen is an American architect.

Education and career 
She has a Master of Architecture degree from Montana State University and sits on the University’s School of Architecture Advisory Council. In 2009 she became AIA Montana’s Architect Licensing Advisor. She is also the State Government Network Representative. In the past, Christensen has held the roles of: Associate Director (AIA Montana), Young Architect Regional Director (AIA Northwest and Pacific Region) and a member of the Internship Advisory Committee and Education Committee of NCARB.
Christensen is the founding executive of Mamas for Mamas – a local charitable organization "offering support to mothers in crisis and ongoing support to low income moms and their children."

Awards and recognitions 
In 2015 she was honored as one of "40 Under Forty" top young professionals by the Billings Gazette and in the same year was recognized by the National Council of Architectural Registration Boards as one of the "13 Must Follow Twitter Accounts for Aspiring Architects." In 2016 she was one of the youngest ever architects to become Associate Principal at Architects Engineers, as well as a Woman to Watch. In 2017 she received the Young Architects Award as well as one of the top 3 finalists for Woman of the Year 42nd Annual Civic & Community Awards.

References 

Living people
Year of birth missing (living people)
Place of birth missing (living people)
21st-century American architects
American women architects
Montana State University alumni
21st-century American women